Interstate 79 (I-79) is an Interstate Highway in the eastern United States, designated from I-77 in Charleston, West Virginia, north to Pennsylvania Route 5 (PA 5) and PA 290 in Erie, Pennsylvania. It is a primary thoroughfare through western Pennsylvania and West Virginia and makes up part of an important corridor to Buffalo, New York, and the Canadian border. Major metropolitan areas connected by I-79 include Charleston and Morgantown in West Virginia and Greater Pittsburgh and Erie in Pennsylvania.

In West Virginia, I-79 is known as the Jennings Randolph Expressway, named for the West Virginia representative and senator. In the three most northern counties, it is signed as part of the High Tech Corridor. For most of its Pennsylvania stretch, it is known as the Raymond P. Shafer Highway, named for the Pennsylvania governor.

Route description

|-
|
|
|-
|
|
|-
|Total
|
|}

Except at its northern end, I-79 is located on the Allegheny Plateau. Despite the somewhat rugged terrain, the road is relatively flat. In the hillier areas, this flatness is achieved by curving around hills, along ridges, and in or partway up river valleys. From Sutton north, I-79 generally parallels the path of US Route 19 (US 19).

West Virginia

I-79 begins at a three-way directional Y interchange with I-77 along the northwest bank of the Elk River just northeast of Charleston. For its first , to a point just south of Flatwoods, I-79 is located in the watershed of the Elk River, which drains into the Kanawha River.

Pennsylvania

I-79 enters Pennsylvania after leaving West Virginia University in Morgantown, West Virginia. South of Washington, I-79 traverses the mostly rural Greene County area.

Between milemarkers 34 and 38, I-79 overlaps I-70 in the Washington area before heading north toward Pittsburgh.

The freeway into Pittsburgh requires drivers to use I-376 while I-79 completely bypasses the city. Beyond the Pittsburgh area, I-79 traverses more rural areas in Butler, Lawrence, Mercer, Crawford, and Erie counties before arriving at its termination point in Erie. In Erie, I-90 provides an important connection from I-79 to Buffalo, New York, and the Canadian border.

Around milemarker 100 on the northbound side are two ghost ramps that were specifically built for the Boy Scouts of America in order to have access to Moraine State Park without having to travel on US 422 for the 1973 and 1977 National Scout Jamborees, which were held at Moraine. The ramps were permanently closed after the 1977 event but remain visible under encroaching vegetation.

I-79 was completely rebuilt in the Pittsburgh area in the early 1990s.

History
The Pennsylvania General Assembly authorized the Pennsylvania Turnpike Commission to build two extensions in the 1950s. The Northwestern Extension, authorized in 1953, was to stretch from the main Pennsylvania Turnpike north to Erie and would have included a lateral connection between Ohio and New York (later built as I-90). The Southwestern Extension, authorized in 1955, was to run south from the main line near Pittsburgh to West Virginia, connecting there with an extension of the West Virginia Turnpike. Except for the section between Washington and the Pittsburgh area, which was included as part of I-70, the first portion of I-79 to be added to the plans was north from Pittsburgh to Erie, along the US 19 corridor.

In September 1955, two short urban portions were designated:
 I-179: A spur from I-90 north to Erie, currently absorbed into I-79
 I-279: A western bypass of Pittsburgh, connecting I-70 with I-80S (now I-76); it and I-79 later swapped designations

The number 79 was assigned in 1958, and an extension south along I-70 to Washington and beyond to Charleston was approved on October 18, 1961. This extension also paralleled US 19 to near Sutton, where it turned westerly to reach Charleston. (The part of US 19 from Sutton south to I-77 at Beckley, West Virginia, has since been four-laned as Corridor L of the Appalachian Development Highway System.)

On December 21, 1967, the first section of I-79 in West Virginia, between exits 125 (Saltwell Road) and 132 (South Fairmont), opened to traffic. This  section bypassed part of West Virginia Route 73 (WV 73) between Bridgeport and Fairmont. Another  opened in July 1968, extending the highway on a bypass of downtown Fairmont to exit 137 (East Park Avenue). It was further extended  toward Morgantown on October 15, 1970, bypassing more of WV 73 to exit 146 (Goshen Road) south of that city.

On June 29, 1970, the swap of I-79 and I-279 was approved. At the same time, I-76 was extended west from Downtown Pittsburgh over former I-79 to the new location of I-79 west of Pittsburgh, so I-279 only ran north from Downtown Pittsburgh. On December 3, 1971, I-76 was rerouted to bypass Pittsburgh, and I-279 was extended to I-79 utilizing the former section of I-76. The changes took effect on October 2, 1972.

On June 29, 1973, I-79 was extended from West Virginia exit 146 to exit 148 (I-68), where, at one point, traffic was forced onto the newly opened west end of Corridor E (now I-68) to exit 1. This completed I-79 from north of Bridgeport to north of Morgantown.

To the south of Bridgeport, the first two sections were both opened on December 22, 1971. One of these ran  from exit 51 (Frametown) to exit 62 (Sutton), and the other from exit 105 (Jane Lew) to exit 115 (Nutter Fort). On September 19, 1973, another  stretch was opened, from exit 105 (Jane Lew) south to exit 99 (Weston).

In 1973, significant portions of the Interstate were completed. I-79 opened from exit 62 to exit 99. Another , from exit 67 (Flatwoods) north to exit 91 (Roanoke), opened on November 28, 1973, along with the section from exit 115 north to exit 117 (Anmoore), completing the route between Frametown and Morgantown except in the Bridgeport area.

A  extension from exit 51 south to exit 46 (Servia) opened on February 1, 1974, and County Route 11 to WV 4 near Duck was widened to handle the increased load. On the same day, two lanes opened from exit 155 (Osage) north to the state line.

On the same day, the eastern end of Corridor D and the western end of Corridor E, both connecting to I-79 (at exits 119 and 148), were opened. This completed I-79 in West Virginia north of exit 46 (Servia); it was extended south to exit 25 (Amma) in late November and to US 119 north of Clendenin (exit 19) on November 13, 1975. It was opened from exit 19 to exit 9 (Elkview) on November 18, 1977, and finally completed to I-77 in 1979.

On July 25, 1975, I-79 was opened between exits 1 and 14 in Pennsylvania. The last piece of I-79 between West Virginia and Erie—the Neville Island Bridge over the Ohio River—opened on September 3, 1976. In 1984, the route was extended about  further to the north, with the opening of a new segment between US 20 and PA 5 in Erie. 

In late 2008, the missing ramps of the I-79/I-376 interchange (PA 60 was designated as the route for southbound traffic seeking to go to Pittsburgh International Airport and for airport traffic seeking to go northbound on I-79) were completed.

In June 2009, I-376 was extended west and north of Downtown Pittsburgh, and I-279 was truncated back to the section only running from Downtown Pittsburgh north to I-79.

Exit list

Auxiliary routes
I-279 heads southeast from I-79 in Pittsburgh's northern suburbs to I-376 in Downtown Pittsburgh.
I-579 heads south from I-279 in Pittsburgh's North Side to the Liberty Bridge and the Boulevard of the Allies just east of Downtown Pittsburgh.

See also

References

External links

 Interstate Guide - I-79
 I-79 in West Virginia at AARoads.com
 I-79 in Pennsylvania at AARoads.com
 Pennsylvania Highways: I-79
 West Virginia Roads - I-79
 Pennsylvania Roads - I-79
 1971 Pittsburgh Press article detailing I-79 progress
 

 
79
79
79
Charleston, West Virginia
Transportation in Kanawha County, West Virginia
Transportation in Roane County, West Virginia
Transportation in Clay County, West Virginia
Transportation in Braxton County, West Virginia
Transportation in Gilmer County, West Virginia
Transportation in Lewis County, West Virginia
Transportation in Harrison County, West Virginia
Transportation in Marion County, West Virginia
Transportation in Monongalia County, West Virginia
Transportation in Greene County, Pennsylvania
Transportation in Washington County, Pennsylvania
Transportation in Allegheny County, Pennsylvania
Transportation in Butler County, Pennsylvania
Transportation in Lawrence County, Pennsylvania
Transportation in Mercer County, Pennsylvania
Transportation in Crawford County, Pennsylvania
Transportation in Erie County, Pennsylvania